Diego Corrientes is a 1914 Spanish silent historical film directed by Alberto Marro. It portrays the life of the eighteenth century highwayman Diego Corrientes Mateos. It was the first of four films portraying his exploits.

Cast
 Jaime Borrás 
 Luisa Oliván

References

Bibliography
 de España, Rafael. Directory of Spanish and Portuguese film-makers and films. Greenwood Press, 1994.

External links

1914 films
1910s historical films
1910s crime films
Spanish crime films
Spanish historical films
Spanish silent films
Films set in the 18th century
Films set in Spain
Films set in Portugal
Spanish black-and-white films